María Uribe (8 March 1908 – 21 February 1992) was a Mexican athlete. She competed in the women's javelin throw at the 1932 Summer Olympics. She was the first woman to represent Mexico at the Olympics.

References

External links
 

1908 births
1992 deaths
Athletes (track and field) at the 1932 Summer Olympics
Mexican female javelin throwers
Olympic athletes of Mexico
Sportspeople from Jalisco
People from Ciudad Guzmán, Jalisco
20th-century Mexican women